Nyctimystes pulcher, the spurred big-eyed tree frog, is a species of frog in the subfamily Pelodryadinae, found in New Guinea. Its natural habitats are subtropical or tropical moist lowland forests, subtropical or tropical moist montane forests, and rivers.

References

pulcher
Amphibians of New Guinea
Amphibians described in 1911
Taxonomy articles created by Polbot